Lewis Brown (February 19, 1955 – September 14, 2011) was an American basketball player.

Brown played collegiately for the University of Nevada, Las Vegas. He was selected by the Milwaukee Bucks in the 4th round (69th pick overall) of the 1977 NBA draft and played 2 games in 1980–81 for the Washington Bullets in the NBA.

References

External links

1955 births
2011 deaths
American expatriate basketball people in Belgium
American expatriate basketball people in France
American expatriate basketball people in Italy
American expatriate basketball people in the Netherlands
American expatriate basketball people in the Philippines
Basketball players from Los Angeles
Centers (basketball)
Crispa Redmanizers players
Great Taste Coffee Makers players
Manila Beer Brewmasters players
Milwaukee Bucks draft picks
Parade High School All-Americans (boys' basketball)
Philippine Basketball Association imports
UNLV Runnin' Rebels basketball players
Washington Bullets players
American men's basketball players